Joakim Karlberg (born 18 March 1964) is a Swedish speed skater. He competed at the 1988 Winter Olympics and the 1992 Winter Olympics.

References

1964 births
Living people
Swedish male speed skaters
Olympic speed skaters of Sweden
Speed skaters at the 1988 Winter Olympics
Speed skaters at the 1992 Winter Olympics
Sportspeople from Gothenburg
20th-century Swedish people